The Casa Marina Hotel is a historic hotel in Jacksonville Beach, Florida. It is located at 12 Sixth Avenue, North. On September 2, 1993, it was added to the U.S. National Register of Historic Places. The National Trust for Historic Preservation has accepted the Casa Marina Hotel to be part of the Historic Hotels of America.

References

External links

 Duval County listings at National Register of Historic Places
 Florida's Office of Cultural and Historical Programs
 Duval County listings
 Casa Marina Hotel and Restaurant

National Register of Historic Places in Duval County, Florida
Hotel buildings on the National Register of Historic Places in Florida
Hotels in Jacksonville
Historic Hotels of America